Dermata Cluj was a football club from Cluj-Napoca, Cluj County, dissolved in 1967.

History
The shoes factory from Cluj-Napoca called Echo Cluj created the team and was the main sponsor of the team until 1948. Notable players from that time was Darock, Bagoly, Kallo, Kiss, Toth. Ferencz Ronay was the first big manager who create a competitive team, and played for the first time in Divizia A, the Romanian First Football League.
Stadionul Clujana (Clujana Stadium) was the main stadium of the team, situated next to the shoes factory.
Even though they finished 11th out of 16th places in 1947–48 Divizia A they were relegated in Divizia B because they lost the Relegation / Promotion Play Off. Also because of the nationalization of institutions in Romania and because of the Communist Regime in Romania the team lost the sponsor and never played again in the First Football League. In 1950, they appeared under the name of Flamura Roşie Herbak Cluj, after the new name of the factory "Janos Herbak".
In 1960, they merged with CFR Cluj under the name of CSM Cluj (Clubul Sportiv Muncitoresc Cluj).
In 1967, CFR Cluj detached from the main team, and Dermata Cluj disappeared.

Their best performance in the club history was to participate in 1947–48, but even they finished on 11th out of 16th, they lost in the Relegation / Promotion Play Off and turned back in the Second League after just one season.

Performances
Liga I:
Played (1): 1947–48

Liga II:
Winners (1): 1946–47

Liga III:
Winners (1): 1958–59

Key

 Pos = Final position
 P = Played
 W = Games won
 D = Games drawn
 L = Games lost
 GF = Goals For
 GA = Goals Against
 Pts = Points

 Div A = Liga I
 Div B = Liga II
 Div C = Liga III
 p = Preliminary Round
 1R = Round 1
 2R = Round 2
 3R = Round 3

 4R = Round 4
 5R = Round 5
 GS = Group stage
 R32 = Round of 32
 QF = Quarter-finals
 R16 = Round of 16
 SF = Semi-finals
 F = Final

The players in bold were the top goalscorers in the division.

Seasons

References

Association football clubs established in 1937
Association football clubs disestablished in 1967
Defunct football clubs in Romania
Football clubs in Cluj County
1937 establishments in Romania
1967 disestablishments in Romania